Pouteria belizensis is a species of plant in the family Sapotaceae. It is found in Belize, Guatemala, and Mexico.

References

belizensis
Vulnerable plants
Taxonomy articles created by Polbot